The 1987 Australia rugby union tour of Argentina was a series of matches played between October and November 1987 in Argentina and Paraguay by Australia. The Wallabies won seven matches of nine and lost the series of test matches against Los Pumas, led by Hugo Porta.

It was the second tour of an Australian side to Argentina, after their first visit in 1979.

Results

Summary
Complete list of matches played by the Wallabies at Argentina:

 Test matches

Notes

Match details
Legend: (Club/Union, in brackets):BA = Buenos Aires RU, BN = Banco Nación, CASI = C.A. San Isidro, CP = Club Pucará, HC = Hindú Club, JCR = Jockey Club de Rosario, LT = Los Tilos, MM = Mariano Moreno, NEW = Newman, ORC = Olivos, PUY = Pueyrredón, SIC = San Isidro Club, SM = Pacific, UCR = Córdoba RU, UNT = Universitario (Tucumán), PRY = Paraguay RU, URT = Tucumán RU

 San Isidro Club: Carlos Pirán; Fernando Sainz Trápaga, Alejandro Ramallo, Marcelo Loffreda (capt.), Diego Cuesta Silva; Rafael Madero, Alfredo Soares Gache; Ricardo de Vedia, Ignacio Cirio, Fernando Conti; Carlos Durlach, Gonzalo Gasso; Luis Lonardi, Juan J. Angelillo, Diego Cash. Australia:  A. Leeds; Ian Williams, M. Burke, M. Lynagh, P. Carozza; S. James, N. Farr-Jones (24' B. Smith); S. Lidbury, S. Tuynman, S. Poidevin (capt.); T. Coker,.S. Cutler; C. Lillicrap, M. McBain, A. McIntyre.

Provincias Argentinas: G. del Castillo (Rosario); R. Annichini (Entre Ríos), J. Caminotti (UCR), S. Mesón (URT), G. Terán (URT); J. Martínez Riera (URT), F. Silvestre (Mendoza); P. Garreton (URT), M. Ricci (URT), Lloveras (San Juan); S. Bunader (URT), P. Buabse (URT); J. Coria (URT), J. Baeck (Mendoza), R. Horta (URT).Australia: A. Leeds; M. Burke, M. Cook, B. Papworth, M. Hawker; M. Lynagh (51' G. Martín), B. Smith; S. Poidevin (capt.), S. Lidbury, J. Miller; T. Coker, S. Cutler; M. Hastill, T. Lawton, E. Rodriguez.

 Cuyo RU: D. Carbonell, G. Zakalik, V. Mazzalomo, C. Cipitelli (capt.), O. Morales; G. Filizzola, F. Silvestre; A. Filizzola, J. J. Chapetta, N. Bertranou; S. Gómez, P. Pérez Caffe; A. Gutiérrez, J. Baeck, P. Montilla. Australia:  G. Martín; I. Williams, B. Papworth, N. Hawker, M. Burke; S. James, B. Smith; J. Miller, S. Tuynman, J. Gardner; D. Frawley, T. Coker; M. Hartill, M. McBain, E. Rodriguez (capt.). 

 Santa Fe: G. Álvarez; Questa, Berra, Hrycuk, Guillermo Álvarez; Salvá, Raffa (37' Gorla); Mordini, Barceló, D. de la Torre (67' J. de la Torre); Epelbaum, Barnukel; Torres, Clement (capt.), Hernández. Australia:  A. Leeds; I. Williams, M. Hawker, M. Cook, P. Carozza; M. Lynagh, R. Stuart; S. Poidevin (capt.); S. Lidbury, J. Gardner; D. Frawley, S. Cutler; A. McIntyre, T. Lawton, C. Lillicrap.

 Invitación XV: G. Angaut (BA); M. Gerosa (BA), J. Caminotti (UCR), M. Loffreda (BA) (capt.), C. Mendy (BA); R. Madero (BA), D. Baetti (BA) ; J. Uriarte (BA), M. Carreras (BA), P. Franchi (BA); A. Iachetti (BA), R. Cobelo (BA); P. Urbano (BA), J. J. Angelillo (BA), J. Coria (URT).  Australia:  A. Leeds; I. Williams, B. Papworth, M. Lynagh, M. Burke; S. James, B. Smith; J. Miller, S. Lidbury, S. Poidevin (capt.); S. Cutler T. Coker (23' D. Frawley); M. Hartill, T. Lawton, E. Rodriguez. 

 Selección XV: A. Camacho (PRY); S. Cabrera (PRY), F. Armadans (PRY), M. Bachero (PRY) (Mera -PRY), J. García (PRY); M. Lanfranco (NEW), I. Yanguela (PUY); R. Brazzon (PRY), R. Etchegoyen (MM), M. Foulkes (LT); R. Baez (PRY), E. Gallo (BN); G. Inganni (BN), M. Bosch (ORC), H. Lacarra (CP)  Australia:  G. Martín; M. Burke, M. Hawker, M. Cook, P. Carozza; R. Stuart, N. Farr-Jones; J. Gardner, S. Tuynman, J. Miller; S. Lidbury, D. Frawley; C. Lillicrap, M. McBain, A. McIntyre. 

 Argentina: R. Madero (SIC); D. Cuesta Silva (SIC), F. Turnes (BN), M. Loffreda (SIC), C. Mendy (LT); H. Porta (BN; captain), A. Soares Gache (SIC); P. Garretón (Universitario de Tucumán), G. Milano (JCR), J. Allen (CASI); E. Branca (CASI), A. Iachetti (HC); D. Cash (SIC), A. Courreges (CASI), S. Dengra (SM). Coach: Rodolfo O'Reilly.
 Australia:  A. Leeds; I. Williams, B. Papworth, M. Lynagh, M. Burke; S. James, B. Smith; J. Miller, S. Lidbury, S. Poidevin (capt.) (66' S. Tuynman); S. Cutler, D. Frawley; M. Hartill, T. Lawton, E. Rodriguez. Coach: Alan Jones

Rosario RU: G. Del Castillo; R. Luchini, R. Márquez, A. Trumper, J. Narvaja; S. Ansaldi, R. Crexell, G. Milano (capt.), C. Schnaider, P. Baraldi; O. Discaciatti, A. García; C. Hechen, M. Baraldi, D. Arrue (Muñiz).  Australia:  B. Smith; P. Carozza, M. Hawker (capt.), M. Cook, M. Burke; R. Stuart, N. Farr-Jones; J. Gardner, J. Miller, M. McBain; S. Tuynman, D. Frawley; A. McIntyre, T. Lawton, C. Lillicrap. 

 Argentina: R. Madero (SIC) (40' C. Mendy (LT)); D. Cuesta Silva (SIC); M. Loffreda (SIC), F. Turnes (BN), A. Scolni (Alumni); H. Porta (BN) (captain); A. Soares Gache (SIC); J. Allen (CASI), G. Milano (JCR), P. Garretón (UNT); A. Iachetti (HC), E. Branca (CASI); D. Cash (SIC), A. Courreges (CASI),(36' J. J. Angelillo (SIC) S. Dengra (SM). Coach: Rodolfo O'Reilly. Australia: A. Leeds; M. Burke, M. Lynagh (capt.), B. Papworth, I. Williams; S. James, N. Farr-Jones; J. Gardner, S. Tuynman, J. Miller; D. Frawley, S. Cutler; A. McIntyre; T. Lawton, E. Rodriguez. Coach: Alan Jones

Bibliography

References

1987 rugby union tours
tour
1987
rugby
1987
History of rugby union matches between Argentina and Australia